Bursa bufonia, common name the warty frog shell, is a species of sea snail, a marine gastropod mollusk in the family Bursidae, the frog shells.

Distribution
This species occurs in the Red Sea and in the Indian Ocean off Madagascar, Aldabra, Chagos and the Mascarene Bassin; and in the Western Pacific.

Description
The length of the shell varies between 23 mm and 101 mm.

References

 Dautzenberg, Ph. (1929). Contribution à l'étude de la faune de Madagascar: Mollusca marina testacea. Faune des colonies françaises, III(fasc. 4). Société d'Editions géographiques, maritimes et coloniales: Paris. 321-636, plates IV-VII 
 Drivas, J. & M. Jay (1988). Coquillages de La Réunion et de l'île Maurice.
 Steyn, D.G. & Lussi, M. (1998) Marine Shells of South Africa. An Illustrated Collector’s Guide to Beached Shells. Ekogilde Publishers, Hartebeespoort, South Africa, ii + 264 pp. page(s): 72

External links
 

Bursidae
Gastropods described in 1791
Taxa named by Johann Friedrich Gmelin